London Heliport , previously called Battersea Heliport and currently known officially as the Edmiston London Heliport for sponsorship reasons, is London's only licensed heliport. Prior to the official opening, the first aircraft to land at the heliport on 8 April 1959, was a Westland Widgeon Series 2, owned by Westland Aircraft.

The heliport, once owned by Westland and then Harrods, is a very small site, making use of a jetty to provide a helipad for take-off and landing, and onshore parking for three to four aircraft, depending upon their size. The heliport provides landing, parking and refuelling services between 08:00 and 21:00 (flights are permitted between 07:00 and 23:00), albeit parking is normally restricted to smaller helicopter categories.

Ground running of rotors is restricted to a maximum of five minutes for the same reason.

In 2003 London Heliport was acquired by Weston Homes. In 2012 it was bought by the Reuben Brothers, who also own Oxford Airport, for £35 million. 

Edmiston announced in August 2019 that they would be taking over the title sponsorship of the heliport with a restyling of the interior & exterior areas as well as repainting the helicopter landing apron. 

Accidents and incidents

On 16 January 2013 an Agusta A109 helicopter diverting to London Heliport in adverse weather collided with a construction crane and then crashed into the street, killing the pilot and one person on the ground. This was the first fatal helicopter crash anywhere near the heliport since records began in 1976.

London Heliport has a fully licensed rescue and firefighting service who are on duty for all aircraft movements at the port as well as providing an emergency response to any helicopter incident within the London area. The Heliports Fire Service also conducts regular training alongside their colleagues in the London Fire Brigade and RNLI and offer training in helicopter emergencies to any emergency service.

References

External links 

 
 EGLW on Helipaddy
 Planning of helicopter stations in the London area - 1961 report commissioned by the Ministry of Transport and Civil Aviation

Heliports in England
Aviation in London
Transport in the London Borough of Wandsworth
Airports in the London region
Reuben Brothers
Buildings and structures in Battersea
Transport organisations based in London